Quartiere Coffee is an Italian reggae band from Grosseto, formed in 2004.

History
They debuted in 2008 with the studio album In-A, produced by Ciro "Prince Vibe" Pisanelli, and performed at Rototom Sunsplash on 12 July 2008.

In 2010 they released the single "Sweet Aroma", which became one of the most successful songs of the band. The band won the "Jammin' Contest" of the Heineken Jammin' Festival in July 2010 and they performed as the opening act for Vasco Rossi on 11 July 2011.

Lead guitarist Gianluca Acquilino died on 16 April 2014 at the age of 34 and frontman Kg Man left the band later that year. Keyboardist Filippo "Rootman" Fratangeli became the new leader and vocalist of the band.

In 2016 Quartiere Coffee participated at the Reggaeville's World Reggae Contest, performing at the Ostróda Reggae Festival in Poland. The band ended up second to the Dutch band The Dubbeez. Their fourth album Conscience was released on 5 May 2017.

On 13 November 2020, the band announced the comeback of lead vocalist Kg Man, and the new single "Back in Town" was released on 3 December.

Discography

Studio albums 
 In-A (2008)
 Vibratown (2010)
 Italian Reggae Familia (2013)
 Conscience (2017)

Singles 
 "Suffer" (2009)
 "1st Round" (2010)
 "Sweet Aroma" (2010)
 "Italian Reggae Familia" (2013)
 "We Are" (2016)
 "Sometimes" (2016)
 "In Jamaica" (2016)
 "Un viaggio" (2020) 
 "Back in Town" (2020)
 "Love mi vida" (2021)
 "Just One" (2022) 
 "Countdown" (2022)

Bibliography

References

External links 

Musical groups established in 2004
Italian reggae musical groups
Dancehall groups
Musical groups from Tuscany